Jacob de Haan (born March 28, 1959 in Heerenveen) is a Dutch contemporary composer known for wind music. Haan has also published various vocal works, including a number of masses for choir, wind band and soloists. His best known pieces are Oregon and Ammerland.

Education 
De Haan majored in music education and in 1984 completed his organ studies with Jos van der Kooy at the Leeuwarden Music Academy, where he graduated in 1984. Subsequently, he lectured in music arrangement, also at the Leeuwarden Academy.

Career 
De Haan is regularly invited as a guest conductor for performances of his own work. He also gives master classes and acts as a jury member at international competitions. He is active in many European countries in addition to Australia, Singapore and the USA.

In Germany, De Haan worked at the Bayerische Musikakademie (Bavarian Music Academy) and the Bundesakademie für musikalische Jugendbildung (Federal Academy for Musical Youth Education) in Trossingen. De Haan works with several professional orchestras and bands, as well as celebrated vocalists.

Awards 
In 2003 De Haan received a music award for his entire oeuvre from the Frisian regional broadcasting company (Omrop Fryslân).

Works 
Abba Gold
Adagietto
Adagio (T. Albinoni)
Ammerland
Arioso (J. S. Bach)
Band Time Expert
Border Zone
Bridge Between Nations
Caldas da Rainha
Caribbean Variation
Choral Music
Concerto d'Amore
Contrasto Grosso
Cornfield Rock
Crazy Music in the Air
Cat Named Bumpers, Euphonium Solo
Dakota
Diogenes
Discoduction
Eine Kleine Christmas Music
Everest (Concert March)
First Class
Shepherd Four Songs
Festa Paesana
Fox from the North
Free World Fantasy
Fresena
German Love-song
Grounds
Hanseatic Suite
Highlight from Chess
Introitus
Jubilate!
Kraftwerk
La Storia
Legend of the Mountain
Let Me Weep (Lascia ch'io pianga)
Majestic Prelude
Martini
Missa Brevis - Musica Sacra
Missa Katharina
Monterosi
Music for a solemnity
Nerval's Poems
Nordic Fanfare and Hymn
Norwegian Songs
Oregon
Pacific Dreams
Pasadena
Pastorale Symphonique
Persis Overture
Pioneers of the Lowlands (march)
'Psalm 150' in 'Mijn ziel prijst in Looft de Heer'
Queen's Park Melody
Remembrance Day (Totengedenken)
Ross Roy
San Diego
Singapore Rhapsody
So nimm denn meine Hände (arr. Jacob de Haan of "So nimm denn meine Hände")
Song of Liberation
Song of Praise
Stille Nacht (arr.)
Suite symetrique
Symphonic Variations
The Blues Factory
The Book of Urizen
The Duke of Albany (2015, for the Harmonie-Fanfare de Vic-le-Comte (France)
The Fields
The Heart of Lithuania
The Musical Village
The Saint and the City
The Spirit of Christmas
The Universal Band Collection
Toccata from
Totengedenken
Utopia
Variazioni in Blue
Virginia

References

External links
Jacob de Haan in French
Official web page

1959 births
Living people
Dutch composers
Dutch conductors (music)
Male conductors (music)
People from Heerenveen
21st-century conductors (music)
21st-century male musicians